The Sixth Circuit Court of the Supreme People's Court of People's Republic of China, opened on December 29, 2016 in Xi'an. It acts with the same authority as the Supreme People's Court and has jurisdiction over Shaanxi, Gansu, Qinghai, Ningxia and Xinjiang.

External links

References 

Supreme People's Court
2016 establishments in China
Courts and tribunals established in 2016